St. Thomas Episcopal Church is a historic Episcopal church building located at 2720 Slaterville Road, east of the post office in Slaterville Springs in the town of Caroline, Tompkins County, New York. It was built in 1893 and is an example of the Carpenter Gothic style of architecture, sometimes called the High Victorian Gothic.  It features include, a steeply sloped roof, lancet windows, lancet covered entry through a side steepled belfry, all of which are typical of the Carpenter Gothic style.

It was listed on the National Register of Historic Places in 1995. Painted white in 1988 when the NRHP images were taken, it has since been painted light brown with a dark brown trim. It is still an active parish in the Episcopal Diocese of Central New York. The Rev. Cole Gruberth is its current rector.

References

External links
 St. Thomas Slaterville Online

Churches on the National Register of Historic Places in New York (state)
Episcopal church buildings in New York (state)
Carpenter Gothic church buildings in New York (state)
Churches completed in 1893
19th-century Episcopal church buildings
Churches in Tompkins County, New York
National Register of Historic Places in Tompkins County, New York